The Wisconsin Badgers represented the University of Wisconsin in WCHA women's ice hockey during the 2020-21 NCAA Division I women's ice hockey season. In the WCHA Final Faceoff championship game, the Badgers defeated the Ohio State Buckeyes by a 3–2 mark in overtime, as Lacey Eden scored the game-winning goal. Appearing in the 2021 NCAA National Collegiate Women's Ice Hockey Tournament versus the Northeastern Huskies, Daryl Watts scored the game-winning goal in a –1 overtime win.

Offseason
September 3: Mercyhurst Lakers goaltender Kennedy Blair has transferred to the Badgers.

Recruiting

Regular season

Standings

Schedule

|-
!colspan=12 style="  "| Regular Season

|-
!colspan=12 style="  "| WCHA Frozen Faceoff
|-

|-
!colspan=12 style="  "| NCAA Tournament
|-

Roster

2020–21 Badgers

Awards and honors
Grace Bowlby, WCHA Defensive Player of the Month (February 2021)
Grace Bowlby, WCHA Defensive Player of the Week (awarded on March 1, 2021)
Grace Bowlby, 2020-21 All-USCHO.com Second Team
Lacey Eden, Hockey Commissioners Association National Rookie of the Month for February
Lacey Eden, WCHA Rookie of the Month (February 2021)
Mark Johnston, WCHA Coach of the Year
Daryl Watts, 2020-21 Preseason WCHA Player of the Year.
Daryl Watts, WCHA Player of the Year
Daryl Watts, WCHA scoring champion (31 points)
Daryl Watts, 2020-21 All-USCHO.com First Team
Makenna Webster, Most Outstanding Player, 2021 NCAA National Collegiate Women's Ice Hockey Tournament

All-America honors
Grace Bowlby, 2020-21 CCM/AHCA First Team All-American
Daryl Watts, CCM/AHCA 2020-21 First Team All-American

HCA Awards
Daryl Watts, Hockey Commissioners Association Women's Player of the Month (March 2021): 
Makenna Webster,  Hockey Commissioners Association Women's Rookie of the Month (March 2021)
Lacey Eden, Hockey Commissioners Association Women's Rookie of the Month (February 2021)

References

Wisconsin
Wisconsin Badgers women's ice hockey seasons
Wisconsin
Wisconsin
Wisconsin
NCAA women's ice hockey Frozen Four seasons
NCAA women's ice hockey championship seasons